Alan Richard Bundy  is a professor at the School of Informatics at the University of Edinburgh, known for his contributions to automated reasoning, especially to proof planning, the use of meta-level reasoning to guide proof search.

Education
Alan Bundy was educated as a mathematician, obtaining an honours degree in mathematics in 1968 from the University of Leicester and a PhD in mathematical logic in 1971, also from Leicester.

Career and research
Since 1971, Bundy has worked at the University of Edinburgh: initially in the 'Metamathematics' Unit, which in 1972 became the Department of Computational Logic, in 1974 was absorbed into the new Department of Artificial Intelligence, and in 1998 was absorbed into the new School of Informatics. From 1971 to 1973, he was a research fellow on Prof. B. Meltzer's Science and Engineering Research Council (SERC) grant Theorem Proving by Computer; in 1973, he was appointed a university lecturer; in 1984, he was promoted to reader; in 1987, he was promoted to professorial fellow; and in 1990, he was promoted to professor. From 1987 to 1992, he held a SERC Senior Fellowship. From 1998 to 2001 he was Head of the newly formed Division (subsequently School) of Informatics at Edinburgh.

From 2000 to 2005, he was a founder and convener of the UK Computing Research Committee, which plays an advocacy role for computing research in the UK. From 2010 to 2012, he served as a vice-president and trustee of the British Computer Society with special responsibility for the Academy of Computing.

Honours and awards
Bundy was a founding AAAI Fellow in 1990, and elected a Fellow of the Royal Society of Edinburgh (FRSE)  in 1996, a founding fellow of SSAISB in 1997, a founding fellow of European Coordinating Committee for Artificial Intelligence (ECCAI) in 1999, a fellow of the British Computer Society in 2004, and a Fellow of the Institution of Electrical Engineers in 2005. He was elected a Fellow of the Royal Academy of Engineering (FREng)  in 2008. He was elected an ACM Fellow in 2014 "For contributions to artificial intelligence, automated reasoning, and the formation and evolution of representations.".

He is the winner of the 2007 IJCAI Award for Research Excellence and Herbrand Award for Distinguished Contributions to Automated Deduction.

He was one of the 41 professors selected worldwide to receive one of the Hewlett Packard Labs Innovation Research Awards 2008.

Bundy was appointed CBE in the 2012 New Year Honours for services to computing science. He was elected a Fellow of the Royal Society (FRS) in 2012, his certificate of election reads

References

Artificial intelligence researchers
British computer scientists
Fellows of the Association for the Advancement of Artificial Intelligence
Academics of the University of Edinburgh
Alumni of the University of Leicester
Fellows of the Royal Academy of Engineering
Fellows of the Royal Society of Edinburgh
Fellows of the Royal Society
Fellows of the British Computer Society
Fellows of the Institution of Engineering and Technology
Fellows of the SSAISB
Living people
1947 births
Commanders of the Order of the British Empire
Fellows of the European Association for Artificial Intelligence